Paul Heinrich Gerhard Möhring (also Paul Mohr; 21 July 1710 in Jever – 28 October 1792) was a German physician, botanist and zoologist.

He studied medicine in Danzig and Wittenberg, and following graduation (1733), he settled as a general practitioner in his hometown of Jever. Möhring was a physician to the Prince of Anhalt. In 1752 he published Avium Genera, an early attempt to classify bird species, which divided birds into four classes and shows the beginnings of the modern groupings.

During his long career, he maintained correspondence with Albrecht von Haller, Lorenz Heister, Carl Linnaeus, Hans Sloane and Paul Gottlieb Werlhof. The plant genus Moehringia (family Caryophyllaceae) was named in his honor by Carl Linnaeus.

Principal works 
 "De inflammationis sanguineae theoria mechanica", 1733.
 "Historiae medicinales", 1739.
 "Avium genera", 1752.
 Geslachten der Vogelen 1758.

References

External links 
 IPNI List of plants described by Paul Möhring. 

1710 births
1792 deaths
18th-century German zoologists
18th-century German physicians
18th-century German botanists
Botanists with author abbreviations
Honorary members of the Saint Petersburg Academy of Sciences
University of Wittenberg alumni
People from Jever